The MSC Student Conference on National Affairs (MSC SCONA) is an annual conference at Texas A&M University where civilian students and military cadets from across Texas and the United States gather to exchange ideas and discuss the role of the United States in the global community. The most recent conference, MSC SCONA 67, was held in February 2022 and featured speakers including retired United States Special Operations Command Admiral William H. McRaven and General David H. Berger, Commandant of the United States Marine Corps.

History 
MSC SCONA was founded in 1955 by John Jenkins '56 and Bud Whitney '56, senior students in the Texas A&M University Corps of Cadets, after they had attended the 6th Student Conference on United States Affairs (SCUSA) at the United States Military Academy at West Point. Jenkins and Whitney sought to bring students from across the South to a similar conference held at Texas A&M to allow those students to engage in an world-class national affairs conference closer to home.

MSC SCONA 1's keynote speaker was United States Army Major General William J. Donovan, founder of the World War II-era Office of Strategic Services that later became the Central Intelligence Agency. The highest-ranking military officer to speak at an MSC SCONA conference was in 2015 with then-Chairman of the Joint Chiefs of Staff General Martin Dempsey, United States Army. The most prestigious civilian was then-Vice President of the United States Lyndon B. Johnson of Texas for SCONA 8.

Organization and Partnerships

Structure

Every year, MSC SCONA develops an overarching topic to guide discussions, anchor policy proposals, and provide inspiration for the conference speakers and facilitators. The approximately 150 delegates represent universities across the United States and commonly include all Federal Service Academies, the six United States Senior Military Colleges, and top schools from across the Southeastern Conference, among other prestigious institutions.

Although MSC SCONA once included delegates from local high schools as well as from countries such as Mexico and Canada, both practices have since been discontinued due to funding issues in the 1990s and a focus on a more rigorous standard of discussions. Since at least as far back as the time of SCONA Finance Chairman Henry Cisneros, later the Secretary of United States Department of Housing and Urban Development, members of the committee have traveled to major cities across Texas to raise private funds from businesses and individuals in order to operate the conference.

The conference is organized and run by a committee of Texas A&M University students. These students, many of them from the Texas A&M University Corps of Cadets and the Texas A&M Bush School of Government and Public Service, serve as delegates, roundtable hosts, and conference staff members as well as the executive leadership. MSC SCONA became racially integrated as a conference in 1961 at the behest of a famous speaker, then-Vice President of the United States Lyndon B. Johnson. This was several years before the host university would follow suit under President James Earl Rudder.

Strategic Partnerships

MSC SCONA has an enduring partnership with the now-70th Student Conference on U.S. Affairs (SCUSA)  at the United States Military Academy at West Point as well as the now 55th Naval Academy Foreign Affairs Conference at the United States Naval Academy at Annapolis. At SCONA 8, one of the roundtable facilitators was U.S. Army Colonel Rocco M. Paone, the founding director of NAFAC just a year before. Although professors from Texas A&M and other schools often serve as facilitators, only SCONA 36 on the future of European integration has received substantial scholarly notice.

Since 2011, MSC SCONA has partnered with the United States Army War College to hold a pre-conference exercise called the International Strategic Crisis Negotiation Exercise (ISCNE). In previous years, this experience has focused on international conflicts like that of the Nagorno-Karabakh region (2018) and the contested island of Cyprus. This exercise is also held at approximately a dozen graduate schools of government and public service nationwide. MSC SCONA remains the only student-led and organized version of the ISCNE program.

The Texas A&M Bush School of Government and Public Service and MSC SCONA have a long-standing relationship beyond student leadership to include speakers such as former Bush School Dean Amb. Ryan Crocker, who spoke at SCONA 56 in 2011 and SCONA 61 in 2016. Ambassador Napper, a Bush School professor, has also had a leading role in the execution of the ISCNE.

In 2017, United States Army officers and civilian staff modified the ISCNE exercise and rebranded as the Domestic Crisis Strategic Response Exercise (DCSRE), in order to better complement SCONA 62's topic of homeland security. Speakers at SCONA 62 included Commandant of the United States Marine Corps General Robert Neller, Director of the National Security Agency Admiral Michael S. Rogers, USN, Director of Los Alamos National Laboratory Charles F. McMillan, and Islamic reformer Dr. Tawfik Hamid.

References

External links
MSC Student Conference on National Affairs Website
MSC Student Conference on National Affairs Facebook page

Texas A&M University
Texas A&M University System
Student conferences on national affairs
Texas A&M University student organizations
Texas A&M University traditions
Military education and training in the United States
Texas A&M Aggies
College Station, Texas
Events in Texas
United States educational programs
University programs